Tracie Howard is an African-American writer of fiction.

A native of Atlanta, Georgia, Howard worked at Xerox, Johnson and Johnson and American Express before penning Revenge Is Best Served Cold with co-author Danita Carter. The subsequent deal with Penguin Putnam led to several novels including Talk of The Town (2002) and Success Is The Best Revenge (2004). Her first solo novel, Why Sleeping Dogs Lie, was published in 2003. Howard was a featured author in Turner Broadcasting's 2003 Trumpet Awards.

In addition to her career as an author, Howard is curator and co-founder of the wearable art company, Ethos.

Bibliography
Revenge is Best Served Cold (2001)  (with Danita Carter)
Talk of the Town (2002)  (with Danita Carter)
Why Sleeping Dogs Lie (2003) 
Success is the Best Revenge (2004)  (with Danita Carter)
Never Kiss and Tell (2004) 
Gold Diggers (2007) 
Friends and Fauxs (2009)

References

External links
 
 Audio Interview with Tracie Howard

Year of birth missing (living people)
Living people
African-American women writers
American women writers
African-American writers
21st-century African-American people
21st-century African-American women